Vignoc (Gallo: Veinyoc) is a commune in the Ille-et-Vilaine department in Brittany in northwestern France.

Population
Inhabitants of Vignoc are called Vignocois in French.

See also
Communes of the Ille-et-Vilaine department

References

External links

Official website Vignoc 

Mayors of Ille-et-Vilaine Association 

Communes of Ille-et-Vilaine